Puščava is a dispersed settlement in the Municipality of Lovrenc na Pohorju in northeastern Slovenia. It extends from the right bank of the Drava River in the Pohorje Hills. The area is part of the traditional region of Styria. It is now included in the Drava Statistical Region.

The local parish church is dedicated to Mary Help of Christians and belongs to the Roman Catholic Archdiocese of Maribor. It is a pilgrimage church built between 1668 and 1672 on the site of an earlier chapel of which only part of the belfry survives.

References

External links
Puščava on Geopedia

Populated places in the Municipality of Lovrenc na Pohorju